The Voodoo Lounge Tour was a worldwide concert tour by the Rolling Stones to promote their 1994 album Voodoo Lounge. This was their first tour without bassist Bill Wyman, and their first with touring bassist Darryl Jones, as an additional musician. The tour grossed $320 million, replacing The Division Bell Tour by Pink Floyd as the highest grossing of any artist at that time. This was subsequently overtaken by a few other tours, but it remains the Rolling Stones' third highest grossing tour behind their 2005–2007 A Bigger Bang Tour and their 2017-2021 No Filter Tour.

"There were lots of hacks out there who said we couldn't do it anymore", remarked Mick Jagger. "But maybe what they meant was they couldn't do it anymore. Anyway, once we started playing, all that died down. You can talk about it and talk about it – but, once we're onstage, the question is answered."

Production design was by Mark Fisher, Charlie Watts, Mick Jagger and Patrick Woodroffe.  Graphic design and video animation was by Mark Norton. Total attendance 6.5 million.

Personnel

The Rolling Stones
Mick Jagger – lead vocals, guitar, harmonica, percussion, keyboards
Keith Richards – guitars, vocals
Ronnie Wood – guitars, backing vocals
Charlie Watts – drums

Additional musicians
Darryl Jones – bass, backing vocals
Chuck Leavell – keyboards, backing vocals
Bobby Keys – saxophone
Andy Snitzer: – saxophone
Michael Davis – trombone
Kent Smith – trumpet
Lisa Fischer – backing vocals
Bernard Fowler – backing vocals, percussion

Set list
The band's set list at the first show at RFK Stadium in Washington, D.C.:

 "Not Fade Away"
 "Undercover of the Night"
 "Tumbling Dice"
 "Live with Me"
 "You Got Me Rocking"
 "Rocks Off"
 "Sparks Will Fly"
 "Shattered"
 "(I Can't Get No) Satisfaction"
 "Beast of Burden"
 "Memory Motel"
 "Out of Tears"
 "All Down the Line"
 "Hot Stuff"
 "I Can't Get Next to You"
 "Brand New Car"
 "Honky Tonk Women"
 "Before They Make Me Run"
 "The Worst"
 "Love is Strong"
 "Monkey Man"
 "I Go Wild"
 "Start Me Up"
 "It's Only Rock 'n' Roll"
 "Street Fighting Man"
 "Brown Sugar"
 "Jumpin' Jack Flash"
 "Farafina" (tape)

Tour dates

See also
 Rolling Stones concerts
 List of highest-attended concerts
 List of highest-grossing concert tours

References

External links
 Mark Fisher's "Voodoo Lounge" gallery

The Rolling Stones concert tours
1994 concert tours
1995 concert tours